Mar'yanivka is an urban-type settlement in Lutsk Raion, Volyn Oblast (province) of western Ukraine. Mar'yanivka is located on the Hnyla Lypa River. Population:

History 

Mar'yanivka was founded at the beginning of the 18th century, from Polish immigrants. Then the settlement was named Musin. But these lands have been inhabited much earlier. This is evidenced by archaeological finds. Specifically, in 1928 on the outskirts Mar'yanivka, near the village Borochychi during a mound of the future rail Lviv - Lutsk at a depth of 1m was found a huge treasure of silver and gold Roman coins in the number of 1500 copies. However, this figure is probably understated, because, according to eyewitnesses, the total weight of the treasure was over 50 kg. Hamlet Musin was named until 1921, and in 1921 the Polish authorities renamed colony Musin to village Mar'yanivka. 

From 1940 till 1962 was the center Mar'yanivka, Mar'yanivs'ka district, Volyn Oblast (province).

The status of urban settlement (town) received in 1958. 

In 1974 there were three factories: a sugar factory (the largest one), a cheese factory and a canning factory.

After 1995 the cheese factory and the canning factory were closed.

Attractions

In Marianivka there are two schools, park, rail station, fire station, police department, hospital, post office, stores, bars, cafe, bank, gym, recently built supermarket and car wash, body shop and a local Marianivka soccer team.

References

Urban-type settlements in Lutsk Raion

ru:Марьяновка#Украина